Damián Ledesma (born 21 May 1982 in Rosario) is an Argentine footballer who plays as a centre back and defensive midfielder for Sportivo Dock Sud.

Career

Club
Ledesma started his career with Rosario Central and scored a goal on his debut on 13 November 2004 in a 3–1 victory against Banfield. He remained with Rosario Central for four seasons and made 101 league appearances and scored five goals. In 2008, Ledesma joined Independiente and went onto make 38 appearances in the league before departing, in 2009, to join Independiente's rivals, Racing Club de Avellaneda. After spending one season with Racing, he left to join Ecuadorian Serie A side Deportivo Cuenca in 2011. 18 appearances followed before he left to join fellow Ecuadorian club Liga de Loja in 2012. His time with Liga de Loja lasted only a few months as he soon left to join Chile's Rangers de Talca.

After one season and one goal in 35 appearances with Rangers, Ledesma returned to Argentina in 2013 as he signed for San Martín. He made his debut on 10 February against San Lorenzo. Six games later he scored his first goal for the club, the second goal in a 2–3 defeat versus Godoy Cruz. He made 17 appearances in total in his first season with San Martín but it ended in disappointment as the club were relegated to the Primera B Nacional. Two goals in 25 appearances followed in the next three seasons (including 2014 when San Martín won promotion, but he  played just once) for Ledesma before he left to sign for Argentine Primera División side Aldosivi.

Career statistics

Club
.

References

External links
 Argentine Primera statistics

1982 births
Living people
Footballers from Rosario, Santa Fe
Argentine footballers
Argentine expatriate footballers
Association football midfielders
Rosario Central footballers
Club Atlético Independiente footballers
Racing Club de Avellaneda footballers
C.D. Cuenca footballers
L.D.U. Loja footballers
Rangers de Talca footballers
San Martín de San Juan footballers
Aldosivi footballers
Central Córdoba de Santiago del Estero footballers
Sportivo Dock Sud players
Chilean Primera División players
Ecuadorian Serie A players
Argentine Primera División players
Primera Nacional players
Expatriate footballers in Chile
Expatriate footballers in Ecuador